Rinaldo Alessandrini (born 25 January 1960) is a virtuoso on Baroque keyboards, including harpsichord, fortepiano, and organ. He is founder and conductor of the Italian early music ensemble Concerto Italiano, performing music of Monteverdi, Vivaldi, Couperin, Bach, and others. He is considered a foremost interpreter of early Italian opera.

Alessandrini did not start piano until around the age of 14. In parallel he participated in a choral ensemble. At age 18 he discovered the harpsichord, took lessons with Ton Koopman, and subsequently gave his first concert.

In 2009 Alessandrini conducted his Concerto Italiano at the annual Misteria Paschalia Festival in Kraków, Poland.

Discography
Alessandrini has recorded for Tactus, Italy, for the Opus 111 label of Yolanta Skura, now part of Naïve Records, and the Arcana label of Michel Bernstein.

References

External links 
 

Italian male conductors (music)
Italian harpsichordists
Italian performers of early music
1960 births
Living people
Bach conductors
20th-century Italian conductors (music)
21st-century Italian conductors (music)
20th-century Italian male musicians
21st-century Italian male musicians